The pubovaginal muscle is a pelvic floor muscle that attaches to the muscles of lateral walls of the midsection of the vagina and the pubis. It is relatively short compared to the other levator ani muscles and extends between the rectum and the vagina.  Other muscles that are part of the levator ani are: the pubovisceral muscle which is made up of the puboperineal; pubovaginal, and puboanal muscles; the puborectal muscle; and the iliococcygeal muscle. The pubovaginal muscle was identified by anatomists as early as 1912.

References

External links

Muscles of the torso
Pelvis
Sexual anatomy
Vagina